Laxman Chetri (born 26 January 1996) is an Indian cricketer. He made his Twenty20 debut for Meghalaya in the 2018–19 Syed Mushtaq Ali Trophy on 2 March 2019.

References

External links
 

1996 births
Living people
Indian cricketers
Meghalaya cricketers
Place of birth missing (living people)